Trzemeszno Lubuskie  (German: Schermeisel) is a village in the administrative district of Gmina Sulęcin, within Sulęcin County, Lubusz Voivodeship, in western Poland.

In the course of the Second Partition of Poland in 1793, the village, under the Germanized name of Schermeisel, was annexed by the Kingdom of Prussia and from 1815 incorporated into the Grand Duchy of Posen. In 1816, after a border adjustment, it became part of the Prussian Province of Brandenburg. From 1871 to 1945, Schermeisel belonged to Germany. After World War II, with the implementation of the Oder-Neisse line the village was returned to Poland.

The village has a population of 700.

External links 
 Jewish Community in Trzemeszno Lubuskie on Virtual Shtetl

References

Trzemeszno Lubuskie